Divided We Stand is a studio album by the American hardcore punk band T.S.O.L. It was released in 2003 through Nitro Records.

The album was released concurrently with Jack Grisham's campaign for the California governorship.

Critical reception
The Houston Press wrote that the album "mixed trademark vitriol into an adult brew lacking none of [the band's] intelligence and intransigence."

Track listing

Personnel
Band
Jack Grisham – vocals
Ron Emory – guitars, backing vocals
Mike Roche – bass guitar
Billy Blaze – drums

Additional musicians
Greg Kuehn – piano, synthesizer, backing vocals
Elvis Kuehn – backing vocals
Bradley Ball – backing vocals
Chris "X-13" Higgins – backing vocals
"Angry John" – backing vocals

Production
David Bianco – producer, recording engineer, mix engineer, percussion, guitar
Rafael Serrano – second engineer, Pro Tools, backing vocals
Bill Scoville – layout and design

References

T.S.O.L. albums
2003 albums